Bang's Falls is a community in the Canadian province of Nova Scotia, located in the Region of Queens Municipality .

References
 Bang's Falls on Destination Nova Scotia

Communities in the Region of Queens Municipality